The Predil Pass or Predel Pass (el. 1156 m) is a high mountain pass on the border between Italy and Slovenia.

Geography

The pass is located in the Julian Alps, between the peaks of Mount Mangart to the north and Mount Kanin to the south. It connects Cave del Predil, part of the Italian municipality of Tarvisio in the northwest, with the Municipality of Bovec in the Upper Soča (Isonzo) Valley in Slovenia.

On the Italian side, state highway no. 54 (del Friuli) leads from Tarvisio and the Canal Valley along Slizza Creek to Lake Predil, where the route to the Sella Nevea Pass in the south branches off, and uphill to the Predil crest. On the Slovenian side, road no. 203 runs downhill to Log pod Mangartom and continues to Bovec. The village of Strmec na Predelu lies just below the border crossing.

History
The road was built from 1319 onwards by the citizens of Cividale in the Patriarchate of Aquileia with the consent of the Prince-Bishops of Bamberg, then the possessors of the Carinthian lands in the north. However, the importance of the trade route diminished after the Aquileia territory in the south was incorporated into the Domini di Terraferma by the Republic of Venice in 1420.

Since 1754 the Predil Pass marked the border between the Duchy of Carinthia with the lands of the Princely County of Gorizia and Gradisca (part of the Austrian Littoral from 1849) in the southeast, both part of the Habsburg monarchy. During the War of the Fifth Coalition, an Austrian contingent under Captain Johann Hermann von Hermannsdorf on 18 May 1809 fought against the French forces moving from the Kingdom of Italy upon the Battle of Tarvis. Hermannsdorf was killed in battle, in 1851 a memorial was erected in his honour.

In World War I the mine railway was used to supply the Austro-Hungarian Army in the Battles of the Isonzo against the Kingdom of Italy.

Gallery

See also
 List of highest paved roads in Europe
 List of mountain passes

External links

Predil
Predil
Italy–Slovenia border crossings
Mountain passes of the Julian Alps